Ski jumping at the 2014 Winter Olympics was held at the RusSki Gorki Jumping Center, Krasnaya Polyana, Russia. The events were held between 8 and 17 February 2014. Women competed in ski jumping for the first time in the history of Winter Olympic Games. A total of four ski jumping events were held.

Competition schedule

The following is the competition schedule for all four events.

All times are (UTC+4).

Medal summary

Medal table

Events

Qualification

A maximum of 100 athletes (70 male and 30 female) were allowed to qualify for the ski jumping events. The quotas were allocated using the Olympic Quota Allocation List, which was calculated using the FIS World Cup standings and Continental Cup Standings from seasons 2012–13 and 2013–14 added together.

Participating nations
100 athletes from 20 nations participated, with number of athletes in parentheses. Greece made its Olympic debut in the sport.

References

External links
Official Results Book – Ski Jumping

 
2014
Ski jumping
Winter Olympics
Ski jumping competitions in Russia